Corymbia aureola, commonly known as yellowjacket or yellow bloodwood, is a species of tree that is endemic to Queensland. It has rough bark on the trunk and larger branches, lance-shaped to curved adult leaves, flower buds in groups of seven and barrel-shaped, urn-shaped or cylindrical fruit.

Description
It has rough, flaky to tessellated bark on the trunk and larger branches, smooth greyish yellow bark on the thinnest branches.

Taxonomy and naming
The yellowjacket was first formally described in 1991 by Ian Brooker and Anthony Bean in the journal Austrobaileya and given the name Eucalyptus aureola from specimens collected by Brooker on hills west of Lake Elphinstone in 1989. In 1995, Ken Hill and Lawrie Johnson changed the name to Corymbia aureola. The specific epithet (aureola) is from the diminutive form of the Latin word aureus meaning "golden", referring to the colour of the bark.

Distribution and habitat
Corymbia aureola grows in skeletal soils on sandstone ridges, often with Acacia shirleyi, E. trachyphloia and E. papuana. It is only known from the Cherwell Range south of Moranbah, the Carborough Range west of Nebo and the Yellowjacket Ridge near Blackwater in central Queensland.

Conservation status
This euclaypt is classified as "least concern" under the Queensland Government Nature Conservation Act 1992.

See also
 List of Corymbia species

References

aureola
Myrtales of Australia
Flora of Queensland
Plants described in 1991